All About Nina is a 2018 comedy-drama film, written and directed by Eva Vives, in her feature directorial debut. It stars Mary Elizabeth Winstead, Common, Chace Crawford, Jay Mohr, Kate del Castillo and Beau Bridges.

The film premiered at the Tribeca Film Festival on April 22, 2018. Shortly thereafter, The Orchard acquired U.S. distribution rights. It was released on September 28, 2018 and received positive reviews from critics, who praised Winstead's performance.

Plot
Stand-up comedian Nina Geld is all good on stage but has bad personal life. Her life takes a turn when she meets a nice and charming man, Rafe.

Cast

Production
In October 2017, it was announced that Mary Elizabeth Winstead and Common, Beau Bridges, Kate del Castillo, Chace Crawford, Clea DuVall, Jay Mohr, Melonie Diaz, Camryn Manheim, Mindy Sterling and Angelique Cabral had joined the cast of the film, with Eva Vives writing and directing from her screenplay.

Critical response

The critical consensus reads, "Led by an outstanding central performance from Mary Elizabeth Winstead and brilliantly held together by writer-director Eva Vives, All About Nina is a delightfully raw dramedy." On Metacritic, the film has a score of 70 out of 100, based on 17 reviews, indicating "generally favorable reviews".

References

External links
 

2018 comedy-drama films
2018 films
American comedy-drama films
2010s English-language films
Films about comedians
Films about interracial romance
The Orchard (company) films
2010s American films